Marine Corps Air Station Ewa (MCAS Ewa) was a United States Marine Corps air station that was located  west of Pearl Harbor on the island of Oahu, Hawaii.  The base was hit during the attack on Pearl Harbor, and later served as the hub for all Marine aviation units heading into combat in the Pacific Theater during World War II.  The base was closed in 1952 because its runways were too short for jet aircraft, and expansion was impossible due to the proximity of Naval Air Station Barbers Point.  Ewa has been abandoned since 1952; however, two of its runways are still visible from the air and many of the revetments still remain in good condition.

History

It was founded as an airship base for the United States Navy in 1925, but no airships ever landed there. The USS Shenandoah crashed in Ohio in 1925, the USS Akron was destroyed in 1933 and the USS Macon in 1935, leading to the cancellation of the airship program. The base's upgrade to an air station began in September 1940, and on February 3, 1941, it was commissioned Marine Corps Air Station Ewa.

By the onset of World War II, the air station had four runways and numerous hangars. On December 7, 1941, MCAS Ewa was the first installation hit during the attack on Pearl Harbor. All forty-eight aircraft based there were destroyed, although the runway was not bombed and remained serviceable. During the attack, an Aichi D3A dive bomber was shot down by pilots George Welch and Kenneth Taylor in their P-40s above the Station.

In April 1944, the 3rd Marine Aircraft Wing was relocated to MCAS Ewa where they stayed for the remainder of the war.

The start of the Korean War saw another surge in activity at MCAS Ewa, but because the runways were becoming more and more unsuitable for jet aircraft, the Marine Corps shifted its aviation assets to Marine Corps Air Station Kaneohe Bay. Ewa was officially closed on June 18, 1952, and its property assumed by Naval Air Station Barbers Point.

Redevelopment

In 2008, the US Navy announced they would be leasing  of the old air station to Ford Island Properties, who plan on building expensive homes and shopping centers to create an urban center for Kapolei. While some local looking to preserve the field are trying to rally support to make it a National Cemetery. The Navy and Ford Island Properties were expected to conclude their lease agreement in August 2008.

In 2013 the Honolulu City Council moved forwards on a plan to have a road built over the airfield.

In 2018 The Louis Berger company was commissioned by Hunt Development Corp (Ford Island properties) to provide an Ewa Battlefield preservation plan.

See also

 History of the United States Marine Corps
 List of United States Marine Corps Air Stations

References

External links

 Photos of MCAS Ewa past and present
 Pictures from the Hawaiian Aviation History Page

Buildings and structures in Honolulu County, Hawaii
Defunct airports in Hawaii
Ewa
Military installations closed in 1952
Military installations in Hawaii
World War II airfields in the United States
Attack on Pearl Harbor